Wurzbach is a town in the Saale-Orla-Kreis district, in southern Thuringia, Germany.

History
Within the German Empire (1871-1918), Wurzbach was part of the Principality of Reuss-Gera.

Photos of Wurzbach

References

External links

 

Towns in Thuringia
Saale-Orla-Kreis
Principality of Reuss-Gera